Sanne van Kerkhof (born 27 March 1987) is a Dutch former short track speed skater.

She participated in the 2010 Winter Olympics and the 2014 Winter Olympics. She was part of the 3000 m relay team which was fourth in 2010; in 2014, the team was disqualified in the semifinal and did not advance to the finals.

In 2015, van Kerkhof retired from competitions. In 2014, she started working with the recruitment company Randstad Holding.

She is a sister of Yara van Kerkhof, also an Olympic short track speed skater and a 2018 Olympics silver medalist.

References

External links
ShorttrackOnLine profile

1987 births
Living people
Dutch female short track speed skaters
Olympic short track speed skaters of the Netherlands
Short track speed skaters at the 2010 Winter Olympics
Short track speed skaters at the 2014 Winter Olympics
Dutch LGBT sportspeople
Lesbian sportswomen
LGBT speed skaters